Robert William Sears, known as Dr. Bob, is an American pediatrician from Capistrano Beach, California, noted for his unorthodox and dangerous views on childhood vaccination. While Sears acknowledges the efficacy of vaccines—for instance, he supports the claim that Chicken pox, measles, whooping cough, polio, diphtheria have all disappeared because of vaccines—he has proposed alternative vaccination schedules that depart from accepted medical recommendations. His proposals have enjoyed celebrity endorsement but are not supported by medical evidence and have contributed to dangerous under-vaccination in the national child population. While he denies being anti-vaccine, Sears has been described by many as anti-vaccine and as a vaccine delayer.

Views on vaccines 

Sears is known for his views on vaccine scheduling. He recommends that parents avoid or delay vaccinating their children, counter to the consensus recommendations of medical bodies, and his book recommends that parents follow his two alternative vaccine schedules, rather than that of the American Academy of Pediatrics. His proposals are popular with parents who are influenced by incorrect information propagated by anti-vaccination activists who seek a "compromise" between embracing and avoiding vaccination. This has contributed to under-vaccination in the US child population, putting public health at risk.

In 2014, Sears said that he thinks "the disease danger is low enough where I think you can safely raise an unvaccinated child in today's society."

Although he is characterized as an anti-vaccine doctor and a vaccine delayer, Sears does say that vaccines work: "Chicken pox, measles, whooping cough, polio, diphtheria, all these diseases that we no longer see very much of anymore, I do say that the vaccines are responsible for getting rid of these." Sears is against mandatory vaccination.

Sears has encouraged parents who choose not to vaccinate their children not to tell others of their decision, writing: "I also warn them not to share their fears with their neighbors, because if too many people avoid the MMR, we'll likely see the diseases increase significantly." This position has been criticized as encouraging "free riding" on the herd immunity created by those who do vaccinate: "This is clearly immoral free-riding, it demonstrates a willingness to make unfair use of the contributions others have made to social cooperation." In 2008, Sears told the New York Times that 20% of his patients do not vaccinate at all, and that another 20% vaccinated partially. He also said that “I don’t think [vaccination] is such a critical public health issue that we should force parents into it." He continues to convey these views on his popular podcast, The Vaccine Conversation. Dorit Reiss rejects the podcast episodes as a source of medical information, as they "repeat anti-vaccine talking points, overstate vaccine risks and understate the benefits".

Sears' activism includes opposition to California Senate Bill SB277, a bill which proposes to eliminate non-medical vaccine exemptions. He also compared non-vaccinating parents to Nazi-persecuted Jews. A fellow pediatrician considered the comparison "disgraceful":

 "To compare the plight of the Jews under Hitler to that of those who willingly forego a preventive treatment that safeguards not only the health of their children, but the community as a whole is to lose all moral grounding. It is to purloin the most appalling suffering of the 20th century’s greatest victims, and assign it to those whose choices make not only themselves but their neighbors less safe. It is repulsive.... Dr. Bob Sears should be ashamed of himself."

Alternative vaccine schedules 

In 2007, Sears published The Vaccine Book: Making the Right Decision For Your Child through the Sears Parenting Library, and, as of 2012, it had sold more than 180,000 copies, and garnered support from celebrities. The book includes his two alternative vaccine schedules: "Dr Bob’s Selective Vaccine Schedule" is for those "who want to decline or to delay vaccines". "Dr Bob's Alternative Vaccine Schedule" is for those "who worry that children are receiving too many vaccines too early". This schedule involves spreading out the vaccines received by the child, and separating some vaccines that would otherwise be combined. The book has been described by Vox as "basically a guide to skipping vaccines," and that "it may as well be called The Anti-Vaccine Book."

Sears has said that he created his alternative vaccine schedules to allow parents to vaccinate their children "in a more gradual manner" rather than by following the schedule recommended by the Centers for Disease Control and Prevention (CDC). His notions, for example that vaccination risks causing "antigenic overload", are, however, based on misconceptions and not sound scientific evidence. On an episode of All In with Chris Hayes, Sears admitted that there was no published, peer-reviewed evidence to support the notion of vaccine overload, and that "my precautions about spreading out vaccines are theoretical, a theoretical benefit to kids..." Health journalist Julia Belluz has stated: "From a scientific standpoint, Sears is a quack: while he claims to be a vaccines expert, he is not a researcher and has never conducted his own vaccine science." Regarding his theory of vaccine overload, "according to the data mustered by the scientific community, he's simply wrong."

In 2008, Sears' "intentionally undervaccinated" seven-year-old patient was identified as the index patient who started a measles epidemic in 2008, an epidemic which was the largest outbreak in San Diego since 1991. The epidemic "resulted in 839 exposed persons, 11 additional cases (all in unvaccinated children), and the hospitalization of an infant too young to be vaccinated....[with] a net public-sector cost of $10,376 per case.... 48 children too young to be vaccinated were quarantined, at an average family cost of $775 per child".

Reception 
Sears' viewpoints and The Vaccine Book have been criticized by the press and numerous medical professionals.

Paul Offit wrote that "Sears sounds many antivaccine messages" in the book. Sears has been criticized by David Gorski, who wrote that Sears is anti-vaccine, and by Emily Willingham, who has dismissed The Vaccine Book as "non-evidence-based." Steven Novella criticized the book's attempt to tell both sides of, and assume a moderate position in, the vaccine debate as like "trying to compromise between mutually exclusive positions, like Young Earth creationism and evolution".

Pediatrician Rahul Parikh has said Sears is someone whose "understanding of vaccines is deeply flawed," that his Vaccine Book "is a nightmare for pediatricians like me," and "is peppered with misleading innuendo and factual errors". He also writes that "Sears misleads parents," using "tactics [like] soft science, circular logic, reporting rumors and outright falsehoods".

Peter Lipson, a physician who writes about the intersection of science and the media, states that "...Sears is a useful (although hardly unique) example of a dangerous doctor.... Despite his protestations that he is not 'anti-vaccine', his language and his recommendations very clearly guide parents to be suspicious of vaccination and to avoid the safe and effective recommended  vaccination schedule." Lipson also considers it less than coincidental that Orange County, California, the same county where Sears practices, has "reported the highest rate of measles in the state last year. It’s also home to some of the state’s highest numbers of unvaccinated children. Of the 20 people infected by the current outbreak [at Disneyland], at least 15 were not vaccinated." Lipson has also written that "The anti-vaccine movement has been driven by lay people such as Jenny McCarthy, and disgraced doctors such as Andrew Wakefield, the author of the fraudulent autism-vaccine paper. He's no longer permitted to practice medicine. But there have been a few actual licensed medical voices over the last several years fighting to keep our kids sick" and said that such doctors should also lose their licenses. As examples of such doctors, Lipson named Sears, Jay Gordon, and Jack Wolfson. Sears responded to Lipson's article in an email. Lipson's response was an extensive point-by-point refutation of each point in the email, a technique known as fisking.

Arthur Caplan calls Sears an "anti-vaxx pediatrician who favors alternative medicine". He also discusses Sears and similar physicians, calling for the revocation of "the license of any doctor who opposes vaccination". He believes they are purveyors of "junk science" who are in violation of the American Medical Association's Code of Ethics. He also states that "California’s medical licensing board frowns on doctors who endanger the public health, and says that 'the board shall take action against any licensee' charged with unprofessional conduct, incompetence or dishonesty. That unprofessionalism is not, the courts have said, limited to 'the actual treatment of a patient.' Sears is squarely in violation."

At an AMA House of Delegates' committee hearing, David T. Tayloe, former president of the American Academy of Pediatrics, expressed his opposition to non-medical exemptions and mentioned Sears in that connection:

 "The AMA does not need to leave a loophole in its policy for the likes of Jenny McCarthy, Bob Sears, etc ... Our vaccines are extremely safe, and children need to be immunized at 90% or more to achieve herd immunity, and we can't do this with choice."
John Oliver talked about Sears on his show "Last Week Tonight" in a segment about vaccines. Oliver criticized Sears' attempts to make parents comfortable with alternative vaccine scheduling, commenting that "Your job is ... not to make parents feel comfortable. You're a pediatrician, not a flask of whiskey tucked into a Baby Bjorn." Oliver also referred to Sears as an "Opportunist quack [sic] writing books that fan the flames of people's unfounded fears."

Accusation of medical negligence 
On September 8, 2016, the Medical Board of California released a six-page opinion accusing Sears of "gross negligence", "Repeated Negligent Acts", and "Failure to Maintain Adequate and Accurate Records". If found negligent, he faces a variety of sanctions, including revocation of his medical license. Some doctors believe this accusation is a witch hunt, while others say that his alleged failure to use adequate documentation and appropriate follow-up care are legitimate concerns.

2018 probation order
On June 27, 2018, the Medical Board of California placed Sears on 35 months of probation after he settled a case in which the Medical Board accused him of writing a doctor's note exempting a two-year-old child from vaccinations without obtaining the basic information necessary for decision making prior to excluding the possibility of future vaccines, leaving the patient and his mother, as well as future contacts, at risk for preventable and communicable diseases. Per the terms of his probation, Sears is required to take 40 hours of medical education courses annually, attend an ethics class, be monitored by a supervising doctor, and must notify hospitals and facilities of the order, with restrictions on supervising physician assistants and nurse practitioners.
Sears denied wrongdoing, saying in a facebook post "Isn’t it my job to listen to my patients and believe what a parent says happened to her baby? Isn’t that what all doctors do with their patients?" and "After all, I don’t want a child to receive a medical treatment that could cause more harm. I am going to first do no harm, every time."

Personal life 
Sears is married and has three children. He is one of eight children born to William Sears, a pediatrician and founder of the Sears Parenting Library, and Martha Sears, a registered nurse and author of parenting books. Sears received his medical degree from Georgetown University in 1995 and completed his pediatric training at Children's Hospital Los Angeles in 1998. Sears credits his interest in vaccines to reading DPT: A Shot in the Dark (1985) as a medical student. It is an anti-vaccination book positing that the whooping cough vaccine was dangerous. It sparked "a backlash against vaccines". The book has been heavily criticized in the years since its publication, owing to numerous changes to the whooping cough vaccine.

Selected works 

 Father's First Steps (2006).
 The Vaccine Book: Making the Right Decision For Your Child (2007).
 The Premature Baby Book: Everything You Need to Know About Your Premature Baby from Birth to Age One (2008). With William Sears
 The Autism Book: What Every Parent Needs to Know About Early Detection, Treatment, Recovery, and Prevention (2010).

See also 
 MMR vaccine and autism
 Vaccine hesitancy

References

External links 
 Cashing in on fear: the danger of Dr. Sears, a critique of his book.
 Dr. Bob's Response to Dr. Offit's Statements About The Vaccine Book
 Interview with Sears – "The Vaccine War", Frontline

Living people
American pediatricians
American anti-vaccination activists
Georgetown University School of Medicine alumni
People from Dana Point, California
Year of birth missing (living people)